Cellio Bucchi was an Italian film actor. He was active during the silent era, where he sometimes appeared in leading roles. Later he was a supporting actor in sound films of the 1930s and 1940s.

Selected filmography
 La congiura di San Marco (1924)
 Hôtel Saint-Pol (1925)
 Nostradamus (1925)
 Beatrice Cenci (1926)
 The Courier of Moncenisio (1927)
 Company and the Crazy (1928)
 Assunta Spina (1930)
 Villafranca (1934)
 The Woman Thief (1938)
 The Count of Brechard (1938)
 The Woman of Monte Carlo (1938)
 Don Cesare di Bazan (1942)
 La casa senza tempo  (1945)

References

Bibliography
 Roy Kinnard & Tony Crnkovich. Italian Sword and Sandal Films, 1908–1990. McFarland, 2017.

External links

Year of birth unknown
Year of death unknown
Italian male film actors